The Let's Elope Stakes is a Victoria Racing Club Group 2 Thoroughbred horse race for mares aged four years old and upwards, run at set weights with penalties, over a distance of 1400 metres, held annually at Flemington Racecourse, Melbourne, Australia in September. Total prizemoney is A$300,000.

History
In 1994 the race was renamed in honour of the former champion and 1991 Melbourne Cup winner, Let's Elope.

Name
 1987–1993  - Milady Stakes
 1994 onwards - Let’s Elope Stakes

Grade
 1987–2004 - Listed Race
 2005–2008 - Group 3 race
 2009 onwards - Group 2 race

Winners

 2022 - Kissonallforcheeks
 2021 - Turaath
 2020 - Pretty Brazen
 2019 - Spanish Whisper
 2018 - I Am A Star
 2017 - Sword Of Light
 2016 - Don't Doubt Mamma
 2015 - Amicus
 2014 - Commanding Jewel
 2013 - Commanding Jewel
 2012 - Zurella
 2011 - Pinker Pinker
 2010 - No Evidence Needed
 2009 - Cats Whisker
 2008 - Mimi Lebrock
 2007 - Devil Moon
 2006 - Rewaaya
 2005 - Dea
 2004 - Beautiful Gem
 2003 - Ain’t Seen Nothin’
 2002 - Purple Groove
 2001 - Flushed
 2000 - Tickle My
 1999 - Zapeace
 1998 - Skyrocket
 1997 - Derobe
 1996 - Rose Of Portland
 1995 - Tolanda
 1994 - Amuse Us
 1993 - Rose of Marizza
 1992 - Mannerism
 1991 - Shavano Miss
 1990 - Natural Wonder
 1989 - Rancheetah
 1988 - Riva Gleam
 1987 - Take My Picture

See also
 List of Australian Group races
 Group races

References

Horse races in Australia